Radzymin  is a town in Poland and is one of the distant suburbs of the city of Warsaw. It is located in the powiat of Wołomin of the Masovian Voivodeship. The town has  8,818  inhabitants (as of 2008, but the surrounding commune is heavily populated and has an additional 11,000 inhabitants).

History

Radzymin dates back to the Middle Ages. It was mentioned in a document of Duke Bolesław IV of Warsaw from 1440. It was granted a town charter in 1475. It was a private town owned by Polish nobility, administratively located in the Warsaw County in the Masovian Voivodeship in the Greater Poland Province of the Kingdom of Poland.

It was annexed by Prussia in the Third Partition of Poland in 1795. In 1807, it was regained by Poles and included within the newly formed, however short-lived Duchy of Warsaw. During the Austro–Polish War of 1809, it was the site of the Battle of Radzymin (1809), which ended in a Polish victory. Following the duchy's dissolution in 1815, the town fell to the Russian Partition of Poland. During the January Uprising, on July 30, 1863, a skirmish between Polish insurgents and Russian soldiers took place there. Russian soldiers surrounded a Polish insurgent unit, but after a short battle the Poles managed to break through the encirclement and escape towards Kałuszyn. Following World War I, in 1918, Poland regained independence and control of the town. During the Polish–Soviet War, in August 1920, it was the site of the Battle of Radzymin (1920), in which Poles defeated the invading Russians.

Following the joint German-Soviet invasion of Poland, which started World War II in September 1939, the town was occupied by Germany. In August 1944, it was the site of the Battle of Radzymin (1944) between Germany and the advancing Soviet troops.

Marecka Kolej Dojazdowa
The Marecka Kolej Dojazdowa was a narrow gauge railway in Poland connecting Warsaw with Marki and Radzymin active from 1896 to 1974.

Sports
The local football club is Mazur Radzymin. It competes in the lower leagues.

Notable residents
 Yaakov Aryeh Guterman (1792-1874), hasidic rebbe
Jan Baudouin de Courtenay (1845–1929), linguist, best known for his theory of the phoneme and phonetic alternations
Julian Ochorowicz (1850–1917), philosopher, psychologist, inventor, poet, and publicist
Isaac Bashevis Singer (1903–1991), writer and Nobel laureate in Literature (born in Leoncin, but lived in Radzymin during his childhood though some sources claim Radzymin as his birthplace).

References

External links
 radzymin.pl
 Jewish Community in Radzymin on Virtual Shtetl

Cities and towns in Masovian Voivodeship
Wołomin County
Warsaw Voivodeship (1919–1939)